Peter Thomas Bauer, Baron Bauer, FBA (6 November 1915 – 2 May 2002) was a Hungarian-born British development economist. Bauer is best remembered for his opposition to the then widely-held notion that the most effective manner to help developing countries advance is through state led development planning supported by foreign aid.

Life 
Bauer was born Péter Tamás Bauer in Budapest, Austria-Hungary, in 1915. His family was Jewish. He studied law in Budapest before embarking for England in 1934 to study economics at Gonville and Caius College, Cambridge, from which he graduated in 1937. After a brief period in the private sector working for Guthrie & Co., a London-based merchant house that conducted business in the Far East, Bauer spent most of his career at the London School of Economics. Bauer started teaching there in 1960 and retired in 1983 as Emeritus Professor of Economics. With the support of his friend and admirer Prime Minister Margaret Thatcher, he was created a life peer as Baron Bauer, of Market Ward in the City of Cambridge on 15 February 1983.  Lord Bauer was also a fellow of the British Academy and a member of the Mont Pelerin Society, which was founded by his friend Friedrich Hayek.

In 1978, Bauer received an Honorary Doctoral Degree at Universidad Francisco Marroquin for his contributions to economics.

In 2002, he won the Friedman Prize for Advancing Liberty; as part of his award, The Cato Institute cited his courage in espousing an approach almost universally opposed in post-World War II international economic circles.  Bauer told London's Daily Telegraph: "I am truly honoured. I have long admired The Cato Institute and Milton Friedman, and recognition by both could not be more delightful."

He died on May 2, 2002

Contributions to economics 
Nearly all of Bauer's contributions concerned development economics, international development and foreign aid. Bauer sought to convince other development experts that central planning, foreign aid, price controls, and protectionism perpetuate poverty rather than eliminate it, and that the growth of government intervention politicises economic life and reduces individual freedom.

Bauer influenced thinking about the determinants of economic advance. For example, the World Bank, in its 1997 World Development Report, reflected the point of view Bauer had been advocating for years, stating that the notion that "good advisers and technical experts would formulate good policies, which good governments would then implement for the good of society" was outdated:

the institutional assumptions implicit in this world view were, as we all realize today, too simplistic... .  Governments embarked on fanciful schemes. Private investors, lacking confidence in public policies or in the steadfastness of leaders, held back. Powerful rulers acted arbitrarily. Corruption became endemic. Development faltered, and poverty endured.

For Bauer, the essence of development was the expansion of individual choices, and the role of the state to protect life, liberty and property so that individuals can pursue their own goals and desires. Limited government, not central planning, was his mantra.

He argued that "The exponents of Western guilt... patronize the Third World by suggesting that its economic fortunes past, present, and prospective, are determined by the West; that past exploitation by the West explains Third World backwardness... and that (their) economic future depends largely on Western donations."

Bauer placed himself in the tradition of libertarians.  In his many articles and books, including Dissent on Development, Bauer overturned many of the commonly held beliefs of development economics. He refuted the idea that poverty is self-perpetuating and showed that central planning and large-scale public investment are not preconditions for growth.

He criticised the idea that the disadvantaged could not and would not save for the future, or that they had no motivation to improve their condition. He opposed "compulsory saving," which he preferred to call "special taxation," and, like modern supply-side economists, stressed the detrimental effects of high taxes on economic activity. Bauer also saw that government-directed investment funded by "special taxation" would increase "inequality in the distribution of power."

Bauer's experiences in Malaya (now West Malaysia) in the late 1940s and in West Africa influenced his views on the importance of individual effort by small landowners and traders in moving from subsistence to a higher standard of living. Bauer recognised the importance of the informal sector and advocated the "dynamic gains" from international trade – that is, the net gains that result from exposure to new ideas, new methods of production, new products, and new people. He demonstrated that trade barriers, and restrictive immigration and population policies deprive countries of those gains.

For Bauer, government-to-government aid was neither necessary nor sufficient for development, and may actually hinder it. The danger of aid, according to Bauer, is that it increases the power of government, leads to corruption, misallocates resources, and erodes civil society.

Bauer also debunked what Ralph Raico has termed the "timeless approach" to history. A person commits this fallacy when he ignores the various events and preconditions which existed before and acted as prerequisites for the event or state of affairs being analysed. Quoting Raico: "Rejecting the 'timeless approach' to economic development, Bauer has accentuated the many centuries required for economic growth in the Western world, and the interplay of various cultural factors that were its precondition"

Major works 
 
  (with Basil S. Yamey)
 
  (with F. W. Paish)
 
  (with Basil S. Yamey)
 
 
 
 
 
 
 
 
  (with Amartya Sen)

Arms

References

 
 
 1997 World Development Report
 Vasquez, Ian (2007). "Peter Bauer: Blazing the Trail of Development".  Econ Journal Watch.

External links 
 Peter Bauer from The New School for Social Research
 Bruce Bartlett on Peter Bauer
 James Dorn on Peter Bauer
 Aid, Trade, Development: The Bauer Legacy
 P. T. Bauer, The Vicious Circle of Poverty: Reality or Myth? (1965)

Hungarian Jews
British Jews
British people of Hungarian-Jewish descent
Fellows of the British Academy
British development economists
British libertarians
Libertarian economists
Life peers
Conservative Party (UK) life peers
Academics of the London School of Economics
Alumni of Gonville and Caius College, Cambridge
Fellows of Gonville and Caius College, Cambridge
1915 births
2002 deaths
People from Budapest
Hungarian emigrants to the United Kingdom
Earhart Foundation Fellows
Member of the Mont Pelerin Society
Life peers created by Elizabeth II